The 1923 New York Yankees season was the 23rd season for the American League franchise. Manager Miller Huggins led the team to their third straight pennant with a 98–54 record, 16 games ahead of the second place Detroit Tigers. The Yankees moved into the now-famous Yankee Stadium. In the 1923 World Series, they avenged their 1921 and 1922 losses by defeating the New York Giants in 6 games, 4 games to 2, and won their first World Series title.

Regular season

The Yankees began their first World Championship Season on April 18 as they opened Yankee Stadium. Babe Ruth christened the new stadium, with a home run in the Yankees' 4–1 victory over the Boston Red Sox. The stadium would later be called "the House that Ruth Built".

On May 5, the Yankees beat the Philadelphia Athletics 7–2 at Yankee Stadium to regain first place, the Yankees would never fall back in the standings for the rest of the season.

Babe Ruth set a Yankees record for highest batting average in one season by hitting .393. Ruth also finished the season with 41 home runs and 131 RBIs. Ruth's average was not enough to win the batting title, as Ruth finished in second place to Detroit's Harry Heilmann who batted .403. Ruth reached base safely 379 times during the season.

Season standings

Record vs. opponents

Roster

Player stats

Batting

Starters by position
Note: Pos = Position; G = Games played; AB = At bats; H = Hits; Avg. = Batting average; HR = Home runs; RBI = Runs batted in

Other batters
Note: G = Games played; AB = At bats; H = Hits; Avg. = Batting average; HR = Home runs; RBI = Runs batted in

Pitching

Starting pitchers
Note: G = Games pitched; IP = Innings pitched; W = Wins; L = Losses; ERA = Earned run average; SO = Strikeouts

Other pitchers
Note: G = Games pitched; IP = Innings pitched; W = Wins; L = Losses; ERA = Earned run average; SO = Strikeouts

Relief pitchers
Note: G = Games pitched; W = Wins; L = Losses; SV = Saves; ERA = Earned run average; SO = Strikeouts

1923 World Series

Awards and honors
 Babe Ruth, AL MVP Award

Franchise records
 Babe Ruth, club record, highest single-season batting average, (.393)

Notes

References
1923 New York Yankees at Baseball Reference
1923 World Series
1923 New York Yankees team page at www.baseball-almanac.com

Further reading

New York Yankees seasons
New York Yankees
New York Yankees
1920s in the Bronx
American League champion seasons
World Series champion seasons